Narcine is a genus of electric rays in the family Narcinidae. These species have a rounded pectoral fin disc and two dorsal fins, the first usually smaller than the second and placed behind the pelvic fin bases. The tail is longer than the disc and has a lateral fold. The spiracles are close behind the eyes, the nasal flaps are merged into a flap in front of the mouth. The teeth are nearly flat, with a central point.

Species
There are currently 21 recognized species in this genus:
 Narcine atzi M. R. de Carvalho & J. E. Randall, 2003 (Atz's numbfish)
 Narcine baliensis M. R. de Carvalho & W. T. White, 2016 
 Narcine bancroftii (E. Griffith & C. H. Smith, 1834) (Lesser electric ray)
 Narcine brasiliensis (Olfers, 1831) (Brazilian electric ray)
 Narcine brevilabiata Bessednov, 1966 (Short-lip electric ray)
 Narcine brunnea Annandale, 1909 (Brown numbfish)
 Narcine entemedor D. S. Jordan & Starks, 1895 (Giant electric ray)
 Narcine insolita M. R. de Carvalho, Séret & Compagno, 2002 (Madagascar numbfish)
 Narcine leoparda M. R. de Carvalho, 2001 (Leopard electric ray)
 Narcine lingula J. Richardson, 1846 (Chinese numbfish)
 Narcine maculata (G. Shaw, 1804) (Dark-finned numbfish)
 Narcine oculifera M. R. de Carvalho, Compagno & Mee, 2002 (Big-eye electric ray)
 Narcine prodorsalis Bessednov, 1966 (Tonkin numbfish)
 Narcine rierai (Lloris & Rucabado, 1991) (Slender electric ray)
 Narcine tasmaniensis J. Richardson, 1841 (Tasmanian numbfish)
 Narcine timlei (Bloch & J. G. Schneider, 1801) (Spotted numbfish)
 Narcine vermiculatus Breder, 1928 (Vermiculate electric ray)

References

 
Ray genera
Taxa named by Friedrich Gustav Jakob Henle
Taxonomy articles created by Polbot